Super bantamweight, also known as junior featherweight, is a weight class in professional boxing, contested from  and up to .

There were attempts by boxing promoters in the 1920s to establish this weight class, but few sanctioning organizations or state athletic commissions would recognize it. Jack Wolf won recognition as champion when he beat Joe Lynch at Madison Square Garden on September 21, 1922, but afterwards the weight division fell into disuse.

The division was revived in the 1970s and the first title fight in 54 years in the division took place in 1976 when the World Boxing Council recognized Rigoberto Riasco as its champion when he defeated Waruinge Nakayama in eight rounds.  The World Boxing Association crowned its first champion in 1977 when Soo Hwan Hong knocked out Hector Carasquilla in three rounds to win the inaugural WBA championship. In 1983 the International Boxing Federation sanctioned the bout between Bobby Berna and Seung-In Suh for its first title. Berna won in the eleventh round.

Notable fighters to hold championship titles at this weight have been Wayne McCullough, Guillermo Rigondeaux, Scott Quigg, Wilfredo Gómez,  Lupe Pintor, Jeff Fenech, Fabrice Benichou, Daniel Zaragoza, Kennedy McKinney, Érik Morales, Marco Antonio Barrera, Manny Pacquiao, Rafael Márquez, Toshiaki Nishioka, Carl Frampton, Leo Santa Cruz,  Isaac Dogboe and Israel Vázquez. Gómez holds the record for longest title reign, at five years and ten months.

Current world champions

Current champions

Current The Ring world rankings

Keys:
 Current The Ring world champion

References

Bantamweight